Ranjitram Suvarna Chandrak, also known as the Ranjitram Gold Medal, was founded by Gujarat Sahitya Sabha and is considered the highest literary award in Gujarati literature. The award is named after renowned Gujarati writer Ranjitram Mehta. It is awarded since 1928.

Recipients
List of recipients:
 1928 Jhaverchand Meghani 
 1929 Gijubhai Badheka
 1930 Ravishankar Raval
 1931 Vijayray Vaidya
 1932 Ramanlal Desai
 1933 Ratnamanirao Jote
 1934 Tribhuvandas Luhar 'Sundram'
 1935 Vishwanath Bhatt
 1936 Chandravadan Mehta
 1937 Chunilal Shah
 1938 Kanu Desai
 1939 Umashankar Joshi
 1940 Dhansukhlal Mehta
 1941 Jyotindra Dave
 1942 Rasiklal Parikh
 1943 Omkarnath Thakur
 1944 Vishnuprasad Trivedi
 1945 Gunvantrai Acharya
 1946 Dolarrai Mankad
 1947 Harinarayan Aacharya
 1948 Bachubhai Ravat
 1949 Somalal Shah
 1950 Pannalal Patel
 1951 Jaishankar Bhojak 'Sundari'
 1952 Keshavram Kashiram Shastri
 1953 Bhogilal Sandesara
 1954 Chandulal Patel 
 1955 Anantrai Raval
 1956 Rajendra Shah
 1957 Chunilal Madia
 1958 Krishnalal Shridharani
 1959 Jayanti Dalal
 1960 Hariprasad Shastri
 1961 Ishwar Petlikar
 1962 Ramsinhji Rathod
 1963 Harivallabh Bhayani
 1964 Manubhai Pancholi
 1965 Bapalal Vaidya
 1966 Hasmukh Sankaliya
 1967 Jhinabhai Desai 'Snehrashmi'
 1968 Manjulal Majmudar
 1969 Niranjan Bhagat
 1970 Shivkumar Joshi
 1971 Suresh Joshi
 1972 Natvarlal Pandya 'Ushnas'
 1973 Prabodh Pandit
 1974 Hiraben Pathak
 1975 Raghuveer Chaudhari
 1976 Jayant Pathak
 1977 Jashwant Thaker
 1978 Father Carlos G. Vallés
 1979 Makarand Dave
 1980 Dhiruben Patel
 1981 Labhshankar Thakar
 1982 Harindra Dave
 1983 Suresh Dalal
 1984 Bhagwatikumar Sharma
 1985 Chandrakant Sheth
 1986 Ramesh Parekh
 1987 Sitanshu Yashaschandra
 1988 Bakul Tripathi
 1989 Vinod Bhatt
 1990 Nagindas Parekh
 1991 Ramanlal Nagarji Mehta
 1992 Yashwant Shukla
 1993 Amrut 'Ghayal'
 1994 Dhirubhai Thaker
 1995 Bholabhai Patel
 1996 Ramanlal Soni
 1997 Gunvant Shah
 1998 Gulabdas Broker
 1999 Madhu Rye
 2000 C. N. Patel
 2001 Narayan Desai
 2002 Chandrakant Topiwala
 2003 Madhusudan Parekh
 2004 Radheshyam Sharma
 2005 Varsha Adalja
 2006 Rajendra Shukla
 2007 Mohammad Mankad
 2008 Dhiru Parikh
 2009 Chimanlal Trivedi
 2010 Madhusudan Dhaky
 2011 Dhirendra Mehta
 2012 Sunil Kothari
 2013 Nalin Raval
 2014 Pravin Darji
 2015 Kumarpal Desai

References 

Awards established in 1928
1928 establishments in India
Gujarati literary awards